is a Japanese footballer who plays as a midfielder for  club FC Tokyo.

Youth career
Tawaratsumida started playing football at five years old influenced by his older brother. At elementary school, he played for ARTE Hachioji FC Junior and later moved on to FC Tokyo U-15s as a junior. For FC Tokyo U-15s, he helped them finish third in the U-15 Japan Club Youth Cup.

He moved up to the U-18s in 2020 and was part of the team that were beaten finalists in the U-18 Japan Club Youth Cup, losing 3–2 to Sagan Tosu U-18s, although Tawaratsumida himself only made a series of late cameos throughout the competition.

In the 2021 and 2022 seasons, he participated more in the Prince Takamado U-18 Football League, playing 27 times and scoring 3 goals.

Club career
In February 2022, it was announced Tawaratsumida would be joining up with FC Tokyo's first team squad as a Type 2 registered player, meaning he could continue to represent their U-18s as well as being registered with the first team. In August 2022, it was decided that he would fully join the top team for the 2023 season.

On 23 February 2023, he made his debut in a J1 League match against Kashiwa Reysol where he appeared as an 80th-minute substite for Koki Tsukagawa.

Career statistics

Club

References

External links
Profile at FC Tokyo
Profile at J.League

2004 births
Living people
Japanese footballers
Association football midfielders
Association football people from Kanagawa Prefecture
FC Tokyo players
J1 League players